Truth and Justice is a 2019 Estonian epic drama film directed by Tanel Toom. The film is an adaptation of the first volume of the 1926–1933 social epic pentalogy of the same name by Estonian author A. H. Tammsaare.

It was selected as the Estonian entry for the Best International Feature Film at the 92nd Academy Awards, making the December shortlist. It received Satellite Award for Best Foreign Language Film, making it the second Estonian film to do so after Tangerines.

The film had a budget of 2.5 million euros and made a box office of 1.55 million euros. It is the most-watched film in Estonian cinemas since Estonia regained its independence. Estonian film journalists selected it as the best Estonian film in 2019.

Plot
In 1870, the new farm owner of Robber's Rise struggles against a rival neighbour as well as his own family and beliefs.

Cast
 Priit Loog as Andres
 Priit Võigemast as Pearu
 Ester Kuntu as Mari
 Maiken Schmidt as Krõõt
 Risto Vaidla as Young Andres
 Loora-Eliise Kaarelson as Maret
 Indrek Sammul as Sauna-Madis
 Marika Vaarik as Madis' wife

Critical reception
The film received widespread critical acclaim from local critics. Writing for Delfi, Ragnar Novod noted that "Truth and Justice is exactly created in the style of world cinema and even the most Estonian-distant person can enjoy film with a calm hearth and without knowing anything about Tammsaare's novels or its meaning on our cultural history. Themes covered in film are universal and therefore I do not find any reason why the film should not be distributed to as far as possible and maybe even be taken into Oscars."

See also
 List of submissions to the 92nd Academy Awards for Best International Feature Film
 List of Estonian submissions for the Academy Award for Best International Feature Film

References

External links
 

2019 films
2019 drama films
Estonian drama films
Estonian-language films
Films based on Estonian novels